Slovakia competed at the 2022 World Aquatics Championships in Budapest, Hungary from 18 June to 3 July.

Artistic swimming 

Slovakia entered 14 artistic swimmers.

Women

Mixed

Open water swimming

Slovakia entered 1 open water male swimmers

Men

Swimming

Slovakia entered 6 swimmers.
Men

Women

Mixed

References

Nations at the 2022 World Aquatics Championships
2022
World Aquatics Championships